Lassana Doucouré (born 24 September 1988) is a French professional footballer who plays as an attacking midfielder for Championnat National 2 club Chambly.

Personal life
Doucouré was born in France, and is of Malian descent. He is the older brother of the footballer Boubacari Doucouré, who also played with him at Chambly.

References

External links
 

1988 births
Living people
People from Beaumont-sur-Oise
French people of Malian descent
Footballers from Val-d'Oise
French footballers
Association football midfielders
FC Chambly Oise players
LB Châteauroux players
USJA Carquefou players
Hyères FC players
Ligue 2 players
Championnat National players
Championnat National 2 players